Bernardus Cornelis Adriana Margriet "Ben" van Beurden (born 23 April 1958) is a Dutch businessman who was the CEO of Shell plc from 2014 to 2022. He joined Shell in 1983, after earning a master's degree in chemical engineering from Delft University of Technology, Netherlands.

During his tenure as head of Shell, the company was ordered by a Netherlands court to reduce its carbon emissions by 45% by 2030. Van Beurden described the ruling as "unreasonable" and said the company had no intentions to meet the court-ordered climate targets.

In early2022, ClientEarth began civil proceedings against vanBeurden and 12other directors of UKbased Shellplc in an attempt to hold these individuals personally responsible for failing to adequately prepare the company for a transition to carbon neutrality.  More specifically ClientEarth asserts that these individuals have a fiduciary duty under the UKCompanies Act to operate in accordance with the 2015 Paris Agreement.

Career
Van Beurden's career at Shell spanned both upstream and downstream businesses. He held a number of operational and commercial roles including those in Chemicals and LNG. Van Beurden worked for Shell in a number of countries, including his native Netherlands, Turkey, Malaysia, United Kingdom and the United States.

Van Beurden was an assistant to Shell chairman Phil Watts from 2002 to 2004, during which time Shell was embroiled in an accounting scandal where it had overstated its oil reserves.

He held the post of Vice President for Manufacturing Excellence from January 2005 to December 2006. Van Beurden was the Executive Vice President Chemicals from December 2006 based out of London, during which time he served on the boards of a number of leading industry associations, including the International Council of Chemical Associations and the European Chemical Industry Council. He was the Director of Shell's Downstream business from January to September 2013.

Lauded for his "deep knowledge of the industry and proven executive experience across a range of Shell businesses", Van Beurden is credited with turning around Shell's struggling chemicals division. From a loss-making enterprise in 2008, the Chemicals business now contributes 5 percent of net earnings. He also worked for a third of his 30-year Shell career in its liquefied natural gas business, which has become a crucial driver of the group's growth. Van Beurden repeatedly called to environmental issues for governments and corporations to tackle global energy consumption beyond supply chains.

In 2014 Van Beurden became the chief executive officer of Shell. In 2014, he was paid €24.2 million. In 2018, Van Beurden's compensation was approximately £17.2 million.

Van Beurden was scheduled to retire from Shell at the end of 2022. In January 2023, Wael Sawan succeeded him as CEO.

During his tenure as head of Shell, the company was ordered by a Netherlands court to reduce its carbon emissions by 45% by 2030. Van Beurden described the ruling as "unreasonable" and said the company had no intentions to meet the court-ordered climate targets. At the same time, Shell's profits were rising sharply, the company raised its dividend by almost 40%, and kickstarted share buybacks worth $2 billion.

He is a member of the European Round Table of Industrialists (ERT), and a board member of International Council of Chemicals Associations and the European Chemical Industry Council.

Ben van Beurden received a pay package of £9.7m in 2022, up by over 50% from the previous year. The information was disclosed in the company's annual report and accounts. The pay hike came as Shell announced the highest annual profits in its 115-year history, at $39.9bn, doubling the previous year's total. The surge in energy prices following Russia's invasion of Ukraine was cited as the main reason for the record-breaking profit. The profits of energy companies have added pressure to tax them more as households struggle with rising energy bills.

Mr van Beurden's pay package was criticized by human rights and environmental charity Global Witness, which called for a people-first windfall tax in the UK government's 2023 Spring Budget that includes executive bonuses. The UK Shareholders' Association also expressed concern that the pay package could bring the corporate world into disrepute.

Personal life
With his wife Stacey, he has three daughters and a son.

Awards
In November 2022, President of Kazakhstan Kassym-Jomart Tokayev awarded van Beurden the Order of Dostyk II degree for his contribution to the oil and gas industry.

References

1958 births
Living people
Dutch chief executives in the oil industry
Chief Executive Officers of Shell plc
Directors of Shell plc
Delft University of Technology alumni
People from Roosendaal
Peterson Institute for International Economics